Lasse Falk (born May 11, 1958) is a retired Swedish ice hockey coach. He coached Djurgårdens IF, Södertälje SK, and Västra Frölunda HC.

References

1958 births
Swedish ice hockey coaches
Living people
Place of birth missing (living people)
20th-century Swedish people
Djurgårdens IF Hockey coaches